Kutah Darreh (also Romanized as Kūtāh Darreh) is a village in Khezel-e Sharqi Rural District, Khezel District, Nahavand County, Hamadan Province, Iran. At the 2006 census, its population was 102, in 25 families.

References 

Populated places in Nahavand County